John Law is a fictional character created by writer-artist Will Eisner in 1948. Law is an eyepatched, pipe smoking Crossroads Police Department detective, who, with his shoeshine boy sidekick Nubbin, is featured in an adventure planned for a new comic book series, but never published. The backup story featured art by André LeBlanc. These completed atories were eventually adapted into Spirit stories, with John Law's eyepatch being changed to The Spirit's mask and Nubbin being redrawn to be Willum Waif or other Spirit support characters.

The unpublished John Law story and the André LeBlanc backup were discovered by Catherine Yronwode among Eisner's original art files, and first saw print in 1983 from Eclipse Comics, under her editorship. They were next published in Will Eisner's John Law: Dead Man Walking (2004, IDW), a collection of stories that also features new adventures by writer/artist Gary Chaloner starring John Law, Nubbin, and many other Eisner-associated characters, including Lady Luck. created by Nick Cardy and Klaus Nordling, and Bob Powell's Mr. Mystic.

References

External links 
Official website
John Law at Don Markstein's Toonopedia. Archived from the original on October 8, 2016.

1948 comics debuts
1983 comics debuts
Crime comics
Comics characters introduced in 1948
Fictional police detectives
Law, John
Comics set in the United States
Comics by Will Eisner